Funrise is an American toy manufacturer and distributor.

History 
Funrise Toy Corporation designs, manufactures, and distributes toys for children. The company offers a line of preschool toys, as well as toys for kids of various age groups. It serves customers through its showrooms. The company was founded in 1987 and is based in Van Nuys, California with additional offices and showrooms in Bentonville, Arkansas; Minneapolis, Minnesota; Ontario, California; Kowloon, Hong Kong; Buckinghamshire, United Kingdom; and Nuremberg, Germany, as well as Australia. As of June 8, 2007, Funrise Toy Corp. is a subsidiary of Matrix Holdings Ltd.

Products

Current toys and games 
 Gazillion Bubbles
 Bright Fairy Friends
 Rainbow Butterfly Unicorn Kitty
 Gla'more
 Mighty Fleet
 Cat (partnered with Caterpillar Inc.)
 Fart Ninjas

Former distributed toys and games 
 Tonka (partnered with Hasbro and Basic FUN)
 Herodrive (partnered with DC, Warner Bros. and Marvel Comics)
 Sunny Bunnies
 Wonder Park (partnered with Paramount Pictures)
 Luna Petunia

Entertainment division 
Funrise's entertainment division serves as the producer for the Rainbow Butterfly Unicorn Kitty television series, which airs on Nickelodeon and Nicktoons. The series is animated by Bardel Entertainment.

References 

Companies based in California